Maggini is an Italian surname that may refer to
Giovanni Paolo Maggini (c.1580–1630), Italian violin maker
Luciano Maggini (1925–2012), Italian cyclist
Mentore Maggini (1890–1941), Italian astronomer
Sergio Maggini (born 1920), Italian cyclist, brother of Luciano

Italian-language surnames